The Makwana, or Makawana is a clan (Gotra) of the Koli caste found in the Indian state of Gujarat. The Makwana clan is mostly found among Talpada Kolis, Chunvalia Koli and Ghedia Kolis.

In 1931 census of Baroda State, there were 20,700 Kolis of Makwana clan in the Baroda state's territory.

Makwana Kolis mostly belong to the Hindu faith but a minor number of them converted to Islam during the reign of the invading Mughal power in Gujarat.

Estates 
Here are list of Princely States ruled by Makwana Kolis,
 Katosan State
 Gabat
 Punadra

Notable
 Savshibhai Makwana

References 

Koli clans